Radom National Park (alternate Al-Radom Reserve) is a biosphere reserve in South Darfur, Sudan, Africa.

Most of it is disputed nowadays between Sudan and South Sudan, as the area of Kafia Kingi, which makes up the vast majority of the National Park, was to be transferred to South Sudan through the Comprehensive Peace Agreement of 2005. However, Sudan is still holding some weak control over the area. The area became a safe haven for smugglers since.

The Adda and Umblasha Rivers form the park’s northern and southern boundaries. Contiguous to Radom is the Andre Felix National Park of the Central African Republic. Established as a park, it was designated in 1979 as a member of the World Network of Biosphere Reserves.

Rivers, streams, and permanent pools cover much of the park, which is characterized as a wooded savannah. Approximately 90% of the habitat is shrubland, while the remainder is forest.

Conservation issues
The park has suffered from commercial game poaching. Subsequent to the country's 1985 famine era, the Tora Hartebeest completely disappeared from the park. The defassa waterbuck has also disappeared from the park.

References

National parks of Sudan
Biosphere reserves of Sudan
IUCN Category II
Protected areas established in 1979
Important Bird Areas of South Sudan